Naro Gewog (Dzongkha: ན་རོ་) is a gewog (village block) of Thimphu District, Bhutan. Naro Gewog, along with Lingzhi and Soe Gewogs, is part of Lingzhi Dungkhag.

References

Gewogs of Bhutan
Thimphu District